Ma Wen-lu, known in the Philippines as Ma Mon Luk, was a Chinese immigrant best known in the Philippines for his eponymous restaurant, and for being the alleged creator of mami (a noodle soup) and popularizer of siopao (a steamed bun based on the cha siu bao).

Early life

Ma was born in 1896 in Zhongshan, Guangdong (then known as Xiangshan, Canton) in Qing China. Because of poverty, he was only able to finish junior high school. He self-studied in the Chinese classics to improve himself. He later became a schoolteacher in Canton but earned a lowly salary.

In 1918, Ma left for the Philippines to seek his fortune in order to win the hand of his sweetheart, Ng Shih, whose parents disapproved of him because of his poverty.

Ma Mon Luk
Arriving penniless in Binondo, Manila, Ma decided to peddle his own version of chicken noodle soup. He soon became a familiar sight on the streets of Manila, plodding from Puente de España (now Jones Bridge) to as far as Intramuros and Santa Cruz with a long bamboo pole (pingga) slung on his shoulders and two metal containers on each end of the pole, similar to the equipment of taho vendors then and now. One vat contained his especially concocted noodles and strips of chicken meat, while the other vat stored the chicken broth heated underneath by live coals. With a pair of scissors, he would cut the noodles and meat to serve to his customers. He called his concoction "gupit", after the Tagalog word for “cut”. He would finally name the dish “Ma mi”, literally meaning, "Ma’s noodles". Later, he would add siopao and siomai to his menu.

However, the claim that Ma invented the mami, which originates from the media company ABS-CBN, is likely untrue. According to linguist Gloria Chan-Yap, mami is derived from Philippine Hokkien maq ("meat") and mi ("noodle") and is Fujianese in origin, not Cantonese. Like the siopao, the noodle dish already existed in Filipino-Chinese cuisine before Ma popularized his version.

Ma became known as “Ma Mon Luk” and from a small shop along Tomas Pinpin Street in Binondo, Manila, he would open his first restaurant with the name “Ma Mon Luk Mami King” at the nearby 826-828 Salazar Street. He would promote his restaurant by giving away free samples of siopao. If he ran out of siopao samples, he would give his business card with his signature at the back to signify a free bowl of mami at his restaurant. The restaurant would transfer to Calle Azcárraga (now Recto Avenue) in 1948 and eventually move to 545 Quezon Boulevard in Quiapo, Manila two years later, where it still exists. By the 1950s, Ma and his food were nationally known.

With his success, Ma was able to return to China and seek the hand of his beloved Ng Shih.  He would establish his family home and main restaurant at 408 Quezon Avenue in Quezon City during the 1950s.

Death
Ma died on September 1, 1961, of throat cancer and is buried at the Chinese Cemetery in Manila.

Legacy
After Ma's death, his children (all surnamed “Mamonluk”) would continue the restaurant, expanding to as many as six branches in the 1980s. By the end of the 20th century, however, only the original two branches established by Ma would remain. The two remaining restaurants are currently operating under the family owned Ma Mon Luk International Corporation.

References

External links
 Ma Mon Luk Restaurant official website

1896 births
1961 deaths
Chinese emigrants to the Philippines
Cantonese people
Filipino restaurateurs
Filipino chefs
People from Binondo
Deaths from cancer in the Philippines
Deaths from esophageal cancer
Burials at the Manila Chinese Cemetery